The 72nd Writers Guild of America Awards honored the best writing in film, television and radio of 2019. Nominees for television and radio were announced on December 5, 2019, while nominees for film were announced on January 6, 2020. Winners were announced on February 1, 2020 in joint ceremonies at the Beverly Hilton Hotel in Beverly Hills, California and in the Edison Ballroom at the Hotel Edison in New York City, New York. The ceremonies were hosted by Ana Gasteyer (Beverly Hilton) and John Fugelsang (Edison Ballroom).

Nominees

Film

Television

Children's

Documentary

News

Radio

Promotional writing

Special awards

Notes

References

External links 
 

2019
2019 film awards
2019 in American cinema
2019 in American television
2019 television awards
2019 awards in the United States
February 2020 events in the United States